The following is a list of Norwegian artists nominated for MTV Europe Music Awards. List does not include MTV Europe Music Award for Best Norwegian Act, MTV Europe Music Award for Best Nordic Act, New Sounds of Europe or MTV Europe Music Award for Best European Act. Winners are in bold text.

References

MTV Europe Music Awards